Robert Lee Porter (born July 22, 1959) is an American former professional baseball player, an outfielder who appeared in 41 Major League games played for the Atlanta Braves during parts of the  and  seasons.

Porter was chosen by the Braves in the third round of the 1977 Major League Baseball Draft after his graduation from Napa High School.  He was in his fifth professional season when he made his debut with the Braves on May 13, 1981.  Pinch hitting for pitcher Preston Hanna, Porter singled off Jim Bibby of the Pittsburgh Pirates. It would be one of Porter's seven big-league hits during his brief career with the Braves.  He collected one extra base hit, a double, and scored three runs.

Porter's pro career ended after his seventh minor league season in 1983.

References

External links

1959 births
Living people
Atlanta Braves players
Baseball players from Arizona
Greenwood Braves players
Kingsport Braves players
Major League Baseball left fielders
People from Napa, California
People from Yuma, Arizona
Richmond Braves players
Savannah Braves players